Dreamhunter may refer to:
 Dreamhunter (album), an album by the Swedish rock band Treat
 Dreamhunter (band), a Swedish melodic rock band
Dreamhunter, book one of the Dreamhunter Duet